Echium wildpretii subsp. trichosiphon is an Echium that is found high up in the area of La Caldera de Taburiente on the Canary Island of La Palma. Like its sister plant on Tenerife, this plant forms a large rosette of silvery leaves which eventually give rise to tall spikes of bright pink flowers. The plant is biennial and dies after flowering. This plant can be grown in gardens, but requires good drainage and fairly mild conditions. The plant hates water falling in the centre of the rosette and will often rot in such conditions.

wildpretii subsp. trichosiphon
Flora of the Canary Islands
Plant subspecies